Agyneta nigra is a species of sheet weaver found in China, Japan, Korea, Mongolia and Russia. It was described by Oi in 1960.

References

nigra
Spiders of Asia
Spiders of Russia
Spiders described in 1960